Caroline Campbell, Duchess of Argyll (16 December 1774 – 16 June 1835), formerly Lady Caroline Elizabeth Villiers and Caroline Paget, Lady Paget, was the wife of Henry Paget, future Marquess of Anglesey, until their divorce in 1810, and subsequently the wife of George Campbell, 6th Duke of Argyll, a friend of her first husband.

The daughter of George Villiers, 4th Earl of Jersey, and his wife Frances, Caroline was married, on 5 July 1795, in London, to Lord Paget, who at that time was MP for Carnarvon. He was the son of the Earl of Uxbridge. Her mother was one of the mistresses of King George IV.

They had eight children:

Lady Caroline Paget (6 June 1796 – 12 March 1874), who married Charles Gordon-Lennox, 5th Duke of Richmond
Henry Paget, 2nd Marquess of Anglesey (6 July 1797 – 7 February 1869), who married Eleanora Campbell, granddaughter of John Campbell, 5th Duke of Argyll
Lady Jane Paget (13 October 1798 – 28 January 1876), who married Francis Conyngham, 2nd Marquess Conyngham.
Lady Georgina Paget (29 August 1800 – 9 November 1875), who married Edward Crofton, 2nd Baron Crofton.
Lady Augusta Paget (26 January 1802 – 6 June 1872), who married Arthur Chichester, 1st Baron Templemore.
Captain Lord William Paget RN (1 March 1803 – 17 May 1873), who married Frances de Rottenburg, daughter of Francis de Rottenburg
Lady Agnes Paget (11 February 1804 – 9 October 1845), who married George Byng, 2nd Earl of Strafford; they were parents to George Byng, 3rd Earl of Strafford, Henry Byng, 4th Earl of Strafford and Francis Byng, 5th Earl of Strafford
Lord Arthur Paget (31 January 1805 – 28 December 1825)

A portrait of Caroline with her son Henry, by John Hoppner, is held at her former marital home of Plas Newydd, now in the care of the National Trust.

In 1810, prior to Paget's elevation to the peerage, the couple were divorced as a result of his affair with Lady Charlotte Wellesley, whose husband, Henry Wellesley, 1st Baron Cowley, was the brother of the Duke of Wellington. Charlotte's brother Henry Cadogan challenged Paget to a duel, but neither was hurt.

Caroline then sued her husband for divorce in the Scottish courts. A divorce was granted in November 1810. Her second marriage, to the Duke of Argyll, took place at Canongate, Edinburgh, only three weeks later. It was the duke's only marriage, and there were no children. The duchess is supposed to have told Paget's brother that she had never previously known "the superlative degree of bliss which she was now enjoying".

The duchess died in Dumbarton, Scotland, aged 60, and was buried at Kensal Green Cemetery, London.

References

1774 births
1835 deaths
Paget
Henry Paget, 1st Marquess of Anglesey
Daughters of British earls
Caroline